Manchester United F.C. is an English football club.

Manchester United may also refer to:

Manchester 62 F.C. (formerly Manchester United), a Gibraltarian football club
Manchester Eagles (formerly Manchester United), a defunct English basketball team once owned by the football club
Manchester United (video game series)
"Manchester United" (song), a 1976 song by Manchester United F.C.

See also
F.C. United of Manchester, an English football club formed by Manchester United fans.